Pterygopalatine canal may refer to:
 Greater palatine canal
 Palatovaginal canal